Sand in Taufers is a comune mercato (market town) in South Tyrol in northern Italy.

Geography
The municipal area comprises the frazioni of Ahornach, Kematen, Mühlen in Taufers, and Rein in Taufers.

The market town borders the Tauferer Ahrntal municipalities of Gais in the south as well as Ahrntal and Prettau further north. In the east, the municipal area comprises the Reinbach gorge and the slopes of the Rieserferner Group. Large parts are covered by the Rieserferner-Ahrn Nature Park, a protected nature reserve which extends to neighbouring Percha, Rasen-Antholz and Sankt Jakob in Defereggen in Austrian East Tyrol. West of the village of Mühlen, the Mühlwald valley stretches westwards up along the Speikboden massif to the Neves reservoir and the crest of the Zillertal Alps.

The local Taufers Railway connection from Bruneck station to Sand in Taufers, built in 1908, was discontinued in 1957. Today, the region largely depends on tourism.

Taufers Castle
The settlement of Tvfres was first mentioned in the mid 11th century in the registers of the Prince-bishops of Brixen. The Tyrolean lordship was ruled from Taufers Castle, a huge medieval fortress which towers on a rock above the village and was built from the early 13th century onwards. Restored in the 20th century, the preserved castle complex is a popular film location, providing the setting of the 1998 drama film The Red Violin, the 2003 comedy Just Married and the 2016 comedy Burg Schreckenstein. It also served as a picturesque backdrop for Roman Polanski's 1967 horror classic The Fearless Vampire Killers.

Demography

Linguistic distribution
According to the 2011 census, 97.34% of the population speak German, 2.30% Italian and 0.36% Ladin as first language.

Demographic evolution

Coat-of-arms
The arms is barry of six gules and argent. The first two of argent have three lozenge of azure, the third has two. The emblem was of the Lords of Taufers that became extinct in 1300. The emblem was adopted in 1967.

Notable people
 Emil von Ottenthal (1855–1931) historian and archivist
 Josef Andreas Jungmann (1889–1975) a prominent Jesuit priest and liturgist
 Erich Kirchler (born 1954) Professor of Economic Psychology at the University of Vienna, researches tax psychology
 Hans Kammerlander (born 1956), mountaineer
 Barbara Ertl (born 1982) biathlete, competed at the 2006 Winter Olympics, she lives in Sand in Taufers

Notes

References
 Josef Innerhofer: Taufers, Ahrn, Prettau. Die Geschichte eines Tales, Bozen: Verlagsanstalt Athesia 1980, .
 Alexander von Hohenbühel: Taufers - eine Dynastenburg, Regensburg: Schnell & Steiner 2007, .
 Idem: Taufers - il fascino di un castello dinastiale, Regensburg: Schnell & Steiner 2007, .

External links

 Homepage of the municipality

Municipalities of South Tyrol
Rieserferner-Ahrn Nature Park